The 1964 All-Ireland Junior Hurling Championship was the 43rd staging of the All-Ireland Junior Championship since its establishment by the Gaelic Athletic Association in 1912.

London entered the championship as the defending champions.

The All-Ireland final was played on 4 October 1964 at New Eltham in London, between Down and London, in what was their first ever meeting in the final. Down won the match by 3–02 to 1–03 to claim their first championship title.

Results

All-Ireland Junior Hurling Championship

All-Ireland semi-finals

All-Ireland home final

All-Ireland final

References

Junior
All-Ireland Junior Hurling Championship